Krzysztof Nowak (27 September 1975 – 26 May 2005) was a Polish football player, best known for his stint with the VfL Wolfsburg team.

Nowak began playing football in 1985. He slowly rose in prominence and in 1996 moved to Brazil with fellow countryman Mariusz Piekarski to play for Atlético Paranaense. He always wanted to play in Europe, so he moved to Germany in 1998 to play for Wolfsburg. Nowak, dubbed "ten of hearts" by his fans, was popular as well as skilled, but was forced to retire from the sport in early 2002 after he learned he had motor neurone disease (MND). Nowak continued to watch the games until shortly before his death.

Nowak was also an important player for the Polish national team, for whom he played 10 games and scored one goal.

In 2002, Nowak began a foundation to help find a cure for MND (he died from this illness). Nowak left behind a wife, Beata, and two young children – a son, Maksymillian, and a daughter, Maria. The ALS Ice Bucket Challenge brought the foundation in Germany much attention, since many Germans who participated in it, donated the money to the foundation.

References

External links
 

Polish footballers
1975 births
2005 deaths
Deaths from motor neuron disease
Neurological disease deaths in Germany
Club Athletico Paranaense players
Panachaiki F.C. players
Legia Warsaw players
Bundesliga players
VfL Wolfsburg players
Poland international footballers
Expatriate footballers in Brazil
Expatriate footballers in Germany
Ekstraklasa players
Footballers from Warsaw
GKS Tychy players
Association football midfielders
Sokół Pniewy players